Mount Kalourat or Kolovrat is a highest mountain in the Malaita Island in Solomon Islands. Located in middle central of island.

References 

Kalourat